Mokhovoy (masculine), Mokhovaya (feminine), or Mokhovoye (neuter) is the name of several rural localities in Russia.

Modern localities

Altai Krai
As of 2012, one rural locality in Altai Krai bears this name:
Mokhovoye, Altai Krai, a selo in Novozorinsky Selsoviet of Pavlovsky District;

Kaliningrad Oblast
As of 2012, one rural locality in Kaliningrad Oblast bears this name:
Mokhovoye, Kaliningrad Oblast, a settlement in Kovrovsky Rural Okrug of Zelenogradsky District

Kurgan Oblast
As of 2012, two rural localities in Kurgan Oblast bear this name:
Mokhovoye, Makushinsky District, Kurgan Oblast, a selo in Mokhovskoy Selsoviet of Makushinsky District
Mokhovoye, Shadrinsky District, Kurgan Oblast, a village in Kabansky Selsoviet of Shadrinsky District

Kursk Oblast
As of 2012, one rural locality in Kursk Oblast bears this name:
Mokhovoye, Kursk Oblast, a village in Baninsky Selsoviet of Fatezhsky District

Moscow Oblast
As of 2012, one rural locality in Moscow Oblast bears this name:
Mokhovoye, Moscow Oblast, a village under the administrative jurisdiction of Beloomut Work Settlement in Lukhovitsky District

Novosibirsk Oblast
As of 2012, two rural localities in Novosibirsk Oblast bear this name:
Mokhovoye, Novosibirsk Oblast, a settlement under the administrative jurisdiction of Chany Work Settlement in Chanovsky District
Mokhovaya, Novosibirsk Oblast, a village in Tatarsky District

Oryol Oblast
As of 2012, nine rural localities in Oryol Oblast bear this name:
Mokhovoye, Belokolodezsky Selsoviet, Kolpnyansky District, Oryol Oblast, a village in Belokolodezsky Selsoviet of Kolpnyansky District
Mokhovoye, Znamensky Selsoviet, Kolpnyansky District, Oryol Oblast, a selo in Znamensky Selsoviet of Kolpnyansky District
Mokhovoye, Kromskoy District, Oryol Oblast, a village in Gostomlsky Selsoviet of Kromskoy District
Mokhovoye, Novoderevenkovsky District, Oryol Oblast, a selo in Surovsky Selsoviet of Novoderevenkovsky District
Mokhovoye, Ivanovsky Selsoviet, Pokrovsky District, Oryol Oblast, a settlement in Ivanovsky Selsoviet of Pokrovsky District
Mokhovoye, Mokhovskoy Selsoviet, Pokrovsky District, Oryol Oblast, a selo in Mokhovskoy Selsoviet of Pokrovsky District
Mokhovoye, Verkhovsky District, Oryol Oblast, a village in Galichinsky Selsoviet of Verkhovsky District
Mokhovoye, Zalegoshchensky District, Oryol Oblast, a selo in Mokhovsky Selsoviet of Zalegoshchensky District
Mokhovaya, Oryol Oblast, a village in Mokhovsky Selsoviet of Zalegoshchensky District

Perm Krai
As of 2012, five rural localities in Perm Krai bear this name:
Mokhovoye, Beryozovsky District, Perm Krai, a village in Beryozovsky District
Mokhovoye, Kungursky District, Perm Krai, a selo in Kungursky District
Mokhovoye (Nasadskoye Rural Settlement), Kungursky District, Perm Krai, a village in Kungursky District; municipally, a part of Nasadskoye Rural Settlement of that district
Mokhovoye (Zarubinskoye Rural Settlement), Kungursky District, Perm Krai, a village in Kungursky District; municipally, a part of Zarubinskoye Rural Settlement of that district
Mokhovaya, Perm Krai, a village under the administrative jurisdiction of the town of krai significance of Chaykovsky

Ryazan Oblast
As of 2012, one rural locality in Ryazan Oblast bears this name:
Mokhovoye, Ryazan Oblast, a selo in Mokhovskoy Rural Okrug of Skopinsky District

Samara Oblast
As of 2012, two rural localities in Samara Oblast bear this name:
Mokhovoy, Kinelsky District, Samara Oblast, a settlement in Kinelsky District
Mokhovoy, Koshkinsky District, Samara Oblast, a settlement in Koshkinsky District

Saratov Oblast
As of 2012, two rural localities in Saratov Oblast bear this name:
Mokhovoy, Saratov Oblast, a khutor in Alexandrovo-Gaysky District
Mokhovoye, Saratov Oblast, a selo in Yershovsky District

Sverdlovsk Oblast
As of 2012, one rural locality in Sverdlovsk Oblast bears this name:
Mokhovoy, Sverdlovsk Oblast, a settlement under the administrative jurisdiction of the Town of Nizhnyaya Salda

Tambov Oblast
As of 2012, two rural localities in Tambov Oblast bear this name:
Mokhovoye, Nikiforovsky District, Tambov Oblast, a village in Yurlovsky Selsoviet of Nikiforovsky District
Mokhovoye, Pervomaysky District, Tambov Oblast, a settlement in Chernyshevsky Selsoviet of Pervomaysky District

Tula Oblast
As of 2012, four rural localities in Tula Oblast bear this name:
Mokhovoye, Bogoroditsky District, Tula Oblast, a village in Tovarkovsky Rural Okrug of Bogoroditsky District
Mokhovoye, Kireyevsky District, Tula Oblast, a village in Novoselsky Rural Okrug of Kireyevsky District
Mokhovoye, Ivanovskaya Volost, Kurkinsky District, Tula Oblast, a village in Ivanovskaya Volost of Kurkinsky District
Mokhovoye, Mokhovskaya Volost, Kurkinsky District, Tula Oblast, a village in Mokhovskaya Volost of Kurkinsky District

Ulyanovsk Oblast
As of 2012, one rural locality in Ulyanovsk Oblast bears this name:
Mokhovoye, Ulyanovsk Oblast, a settlement in Orekhovsky Rural Okrug of Radishchevsky District

Voronezh Oblast
As of 2012, three rural localities in Voronezh Oblast bear this name:
Mokhovoy, Voronezh Oblast, a khutor in Sinelipyagovskoye Rural Settlement of Nizhnedevitsky District
Mokhovoye, Anninsky District, Voronezh Oblast, a selo in Novokurlakskoye Rural Settlement of Anninsky District
Mokhovoye, Povorinsky District, Voronezh Oblast, a settlement in Samodurovskoye Rural Settlement of Povorinsky District

Abolished localities
Mokhovoye, Beryozovsky District, Perm Krai, a village in Beryozovsky District of Perm Krai; abolished in December 2011

Alternative names
Mokhovaya, alternative name of Mokhovskoye, a selo in Mokhovskoy Selsoviet of Aleysky District in Altai Krai; 
Mokhovaya, alternative name of Mokhovo, a selo in Mokhovskaya Rural Territory of Belovsky District in Kemerovo Oblast;